The Corral Fire was a wildfire that burned from November 24 until November 27, 2007 in the Malibu Creek State Park. The fire, which burned  of land, forced the evacuation of 10,000–14,000 residents in Los Angeles, and injured 7 firefighters.

The fire
The recurrence of powerful Santa Ana Winds fueled the fire upon its start on November 24 at 3:24 AM PST. The Corral Fire rapidly expanded, and soon destroyed over 80 structures, including 49 homes, with another 27 damaged. Governor Arnold Schwarzenegger reactivated the state of emergency on November 24, which was declared during the previous month wildfires to "...(provide) any needed resources to fight these fires or help those Californians who have been impacted." During the morning of November 27, at 8:00 AM PST, the Corral Fire was reported to be 100% contained.

Gallery

See also
2007 California wildfires
October 2007 California wildfires

References 

2007 California wildfires
Wildfires in Los Angeles County, California